The Cape Henderson Nature Reserve, part of the greater East London Coast Nature Reserve, is a coastal forest reserve in the Wild Coast region of the Eastern Cape, South Africa.

History 
The  reserve was created in 1983 along with the Gulu Nature Reserve and Kwelera Nature Reserve for the conservation of the region's fauna and flora.

See also 

 List of protected areas of South Africa

References 

Nature reserves in South Africa
Eastern Cape Provincial Parks